Onbara Dam is a dam in the Okayama Prefecture, Japan, completed in 1927.

The Onbara Dam is the oldest existing buttress dam for power generation. 

It is unknown if or how many buildings were submerged in the construction of the dam.

References 

Dams in Okayama Prefecture
Dams completed in 1927